Merophyas tenuifascia is a species of moth of the family Tortricidae. It is found in Australia, where it has been recorded from Tasmania. The habitat consists of montane open forests.

The wingspan is about 12.5 mm.

References

	

Moths described in 1927
Archipini